The 1971 Western Australian state election was held on 20 February 1971.

Retiring Members

Labor
 Arthur Moir (Boulder-Dundas)

Liberal
 Stewart Bovell (Vasse)
 Richard Burt (Murchison-Eyre)
 Ken Dunn (Darling Range)
 Hugh Guthrie (Subiaco)
 Guy Henn (Wembley)
 Clayton Mitchell (Stirling)

Country
 James Craig (Toodyay)
 Ron Kitney (Blackwood)

Legislative Assembly
Sitting members are shown in bold text.

Legislative Council
Sitting members are shown in bold text.

See also
Members of the Western Australian Legislative Assembly, 1968–1971
Members of the Western Australian Legislative Assembly, 1971–1974
Members of the Western Australian Legislative Council, 1968–1971
Members of the Western Australian Legislative Council, 1971–1974
1971 Western Australian state election

References
 

Candidates for Western Australian state elections